Ivanje Selo is a village north of Rakek in the Municipality of Cerknica in the Inner Carniola region of Slovenia.

Church

The local church, built south of the settlement, is dedicated to Saint Jerome and belongs to the Parish of Unec.

References

External links 

Ivanje Selo on Geopedia

Populated places in the Municipality of Cerknica